Gaston Ratelot (28 January 1890 – 21 April 1944) was a French gymnast. He competed in the men's artistic individual all-around event at the 1908 Summer Olympics. He was killed in action during World War II.

References

External links
 

1890 births
1944 deaths
French male artistic gymnasts
Olympic gymnasts of France
Gymnasts at the 1908 Summer Olympics
Gymnasts from Paris
French civilians killed in World War II
20th-century French people